Dicksonia fibrosa, the golden tree fern, whekī-ponga or kuripaka (in Māori) is a species of medium-sized tree fern native to New Zealand.

D. fibrosa has a thick, soft and fibrous rusty brown trunk. It holds on to its dead leaves producing a distinctive pale brown skirt, distinguishing it from the related Dicksonia squarrosa. It requires winter protection in any area that is subject to winter frosts. It has gained the Royal Horticultural Society's Award of Garden Merit.

Distribution
D. fibrosa can be found in the South Island, Stewart and Chatham Islands; also in the North Island, but is uncommon north of the Waikato River and Coromandel Peninsula.

Human Use
Slabs cut from the thick stem of the whekī-ponga, alongside D. squarrosa, were used by Māori over 150 years ago in constructing the outside of houses, or lining underground storage spaces.

References

External links

Dicksoniaceae
Endemic flora of New Zealand
Ferns of New Zealand
Trees of New Zealand
Trees of mild maritime climate
Garden plants of Oceania
Ornamental trees
Taxa named by William Colenso
Plants described in 1845